This is a list of flag bearers who have represented Costa Rica at the Olympics.

Flag bearers carry the national flag of their country at the opening ceremony of the Olympic Games.

See also
Costa Rica at the Olympics

References

Costa Rica at the Olympics
Costa Rica
Olympic flagbearers
Olympic flagbearers